Chandigarh Literati or Chandigarh Literature Festival is a literary festival held in Chandigarh, India. It is organised by the Chandigarh Literary Society with the support of the Chandigarh Administration and Haryana Tourism.

History 

According to the chairperson of Dr. Sumita Misra, IAS, the Chandigarh Literati was originally conceived in an attempt to promote the literary arts in the city, provide a platform for talented regional writers and thinkers and make available world-class writers to the public. The festival promotes poetry, haiku, vernacular writers as well as fiction and non-fiction writers in English and regional languages like Punjabi, Hindi, etc. "Chandigarh Lit Fest shall showcase the very best in contemporary writing from established and emerging writers, and inspire children as well as all those engaged in creative reading and writing pursuits."

2013 Festival 

The 2013 festival was graced by more than thirty authors from different parts of the country, including bestselling authors and celebrities like Bhaskar Ghose, Gul Panag, Ashwin Sanghi, Jerry Pinto, Meghna Pant, V. Sudarshan, Tishaa Khosla, etc. The two-day festival was organised at the Lake View Club on 23-24 November. There were many sessions which included book readings, author discussions and book launches. The festival attracted visitors from all across the country.

Participating Authors 

The following authors participated in the 2013 Chandigarh Literati.

 Kishwar Desai
 Bhaskar Ghose
 Madhu Kishwar
 Gul Panag
  Imtiaz Ali
 Kishalay Bhattacharjee
 Jaideep Bhoosreddy
 Upamanyu Chatterjee
 Angelee Deodhar
 Krishna Shastri Devulapalli
 Pam Handa
 Irshad Kamil
 Manju Kapur
 Tishaa Khosla
 Gen. V.P. Malik
 Govind Mishra
 Rahul Pandita
 Pushpesh Pant
 Meghna Pant
 Jerry Pinto
 Nandita C. Puri
 Manjula Rana
 Ashwin Sanghi
 Navtej Singh Sarna
 Manish Shukla
 Jai Arjun Singh
 Mohyna Srinivasan
 Bubbu Tir
 Ashok Vajpeyi
 Ram Varma
 Chandra Shekhar Verma
 Gyan Prakash Vivek

References

External links 
 Chandigarh Literature Festival - Official website.

Literary festivals in India